From January 3 to June 5, 2012, voters of the Democratic Party chose its nominee for president in the 2012 United States presidential election. President Barack Obama won the Democratic Party nomination by securing more than the required 2,383 delegates on April 3, 2012, after a series of primary elections and caucuses. He was formally nominated by the 2012 Democratic National Convention on September 5, 2012, in Charlotte, North Carolina.

Primary race overview

The general expectation was that, with President Barack Obama having the advantage of incumbency and being the only viable candidate running, the race would be merely pro forma. Vermont senator Bernie Sanders reportedly considered challenging Obama in the primaries but decided not to run after then-Senate Majority Leader Harry Reid talked him out of it.

Several of the lesser-known candidates made efforts to raise visibility. Some Occupy movement activists made an attempt to take over the Iowa caucuses, and got about 2% of the vote for Uncommitted. With nine minor candidates on the ballot in New Hampshire, there was a debate at Saint Anselm College in Goffstown, New Hampshire on December 19, 2011, in which seven candidates participated. Anti-abortion activist Randall Terry bought time on television in order to show graphic commercials denouncing abortion.

Three candidates – other than Obama – who had been on the ballot in New Hampshire were also on the ballot in Missouri. One such candidate, Randall Terry, attempted to air graphic TV commercials during Super Bowl XLIV, but was met with resistance from various TV stations in some locations. The Democratic National Committee also tried to stop the ads by claiming that Terry was not a legitimate Democratic candidate even though he was legally on the ballot.

A number of partisans of Barack Obama citizenship conspiracy theories, challenging the legitimacy of Obama's birthright citizenship, attempted to have the President's name removed from the Georgia primary ballot. A state administrative judge upheld a subpoena, which was ignored by the President and his staff. In February 2012, the activists' legal challenge was rejected by a Georgia state law judge and by the Secretary of State of Georgia, and Obama remained listed on the primary ballot.

On May 8, 2012, Keith Russell Judd, an inmate serving a 17.5-year sentence, won 41% of the primary vote in West Virginia against incumbent Barack Obama, a higher percentage of the vote in one state than any other primary opponent of Obama had hitherto achieved in 2012. Shortly thereafter, attorney John Wolfe, Jr. won 42% of the primary vote in Arkansas after widespread speculation that Wolfe could possibly pull off an upset of the state.

Challengers to President Obama only qualified for the ballot in eight states – New Hampshire, Missouri, Oklahoma, Louisiana, Texas, West Virginia, Arkansas, and Alaska – while a ninth (Ohio) was going to have Randall Terry on the ballot, but removed his name before the ballots were printed. Randall Terry also attempted to contest the Kansas caucus, but was denied a spot on the caucus ballot after the state's Democratic Party determined that he didn't meet the requirements.

Darcy Richardson suspended his bid for the nomination on April 28, 2012. He still appeared on the ballot in Texas and was an eligible write-in candidate in California after suspending his campaign.

Four states canceled their respective Democratic primaries altogether, citing Obama being the only candidate to qualify on their respective ballot: Connecticut, Delaware, New York, and Virginia.

Despite the limited opposition and ultimately receiving 100% of the pledged delegates, Obama's total percentage of the national popular primary vote was the lowest of any incumbent since the contested 1992 election when George H. W. Bush was challenged by Pat Buchanan.

Even without any clear candidate opposition, Obama faced a considerable amount of resistance in several southern states such as Arkansas, Oklahoma and Kentucky. None of the three had been contested by the same anti-Obama candidate, yet ran significant margins, to the point some speculated he would lose these contests.

Performance of losing candidates

Obama was on the ballot in all states, where he ran mostly unopposed. In addition to Obama, the following table lists those candidates that attained ballot status in at least one state, as well as those states that listed "Uncommitted" or "No Preference" as an option:

Second-place by state

Counties carried

Candidates

Nominee

Withdrew during primaries

Delegate allocation

The number of pledged delegates allocated to each of the 50 U.S. states and Washington, D.C. is based on two main factors: (1) the proportion of votes each state gave to the Democratic candidate in the last three presidential elections, and (2) the number of electoral votes each state has in the United States Electoral College. In addition, fixed numbers of delegates are allocated to Puerto Rico, American Samoa, Guam, the U.S. Virgin Islands, and Democrats Abroad under the party's delegate selection rules. Depending on each state's law and each state's party rules, when voters cast ballots for a candidate in a presidential caucus or primary, they may be voting to actually award delegates bound to vote for a particular candidate at the state or national convention (binding primary or caucus), or they may simply be expressing an opinion that the state party is not bound to follow in selecting delegates to the national convention (non-binding primary or caucus).

States are awarded bonus pledged delegates if they schedule their primary or caucus later in the primary season. Those states with April dates are awarded a 10 percent increase, while those who schedule from May 1 to June 12 get a 20 percent increase. And starting on March 20, a 15 percent bonus is awarded when clusters of three or more neighboring states begin on the same day.

The unpledged superdelegates included members of the United States House of Representatives and Senate, state and territorial governors, members of the Democratic National Committee, and other party leaders. Because of possible deaths, resignations, or the results of intervening or special elections, the final number of these superdelegates was not known until the week of the convention.

Some delegates committed to candidates other than the President were not permitted to be elected in contested primaries for administrative reasons.

Calendar

Primary schedule
The date for the first determining step for election of pledged delegates, is listed for each of the 56 constituencies. Northern Mariana Islands caucuses were only organized for Republicans and not for Democrats in 2012.

* - Unopposed
# - Primary Canceled

 Notes
 Florida's legislature set the date for its primary on January 31, violating the scheduling guidelines of the Democratic National Committee (DNC). The DNC has since declared Florida's primary as nonbinding, and therefore an alternate delegate selection system consisting of county caucuses will now take place on May 5, followed by a state convention in June.
 Randall Terry collected 18% of the votes, winning twelve counties, in the Oklahoma primary, qualifying him for seven delegates to the 2012 Democratic National Convention.  Jim Rogers collected 13% of the votes, winning three counties, qualifying him for three delegates (one from each of three congressional districts where he collected over 15%).

State results

New Hampshire
A Democratic presidential candidates debate, held at Saint Anselm College in December 2011, was attended by seven candidates; Obama did not participate.
A total of 60,659 votes were cast in the primary. Obama won with 49,080 votes. The total votes cast were more than 30 percent fewer than in 1996, the last time that a Democratic president ran for re-election without significant opposition. As is typical in New Hampshire primaries, there were a number of write in votes for politicians from the other party.

Oklahoma

Louisiana

Missouri

Arkansas

See also
United States presidential election
2012 Democratic National Convention
Republican Party presidential primaries, 2012

References

 
Barack Obama 2012 presidential campaign